Livingston Football Club is a Scottish professional football club based in Livingston, West Lothian.

Livingston currently play in the Scottish Premiership and were founded in 1943 as Ferranti Thistle, a works team. The club was admitted to the Scottish Football League and renamed as Meadowbank Thistle in 1974, and played its matches at Meadowbank Stadium in Edinburgh. In 1995, the club was relocated to Livingston, West Lothian and renamed after the town. Since then Livingston have played their home games at Almondvale Stadium. In the ten years following the move to Livingston the club enjoyed notable success, winning promotion to the Scottish Premier League in 2001, qualifying for the UEFA Cup in its maiden season in the top flight (finishing third behind Celtic and Rangers) and winning the 2004 Scottish League Cup. However, the club hit financial problems in 2004, and was relegated to the Scottish First Division in 2006. In July 2009 the club faced further financial problems and were on the verge of suffering a liquidation event before a deal was struck. Livingston were subsequently demoted to the Scottish Third Division, but the club achieved consecutive promotions and went on to regain its place in the top tier after winning the 2017–18 Scottish Premiership play-offs.

History

Ferranti Thistle (1943–1974)
The club began life as Ferranti Amateurs in 1943. A works team of the Ferranti engineering company, they initially played in the Edinburgh FA's Amateur Second Division. In 1948 the club became known as Ferranti Thistle and began competing in the Edinburgh and District Welfare Association where they competed for five seasons, before moving to senior football in 1953 joining the East of Scotland League. During this period the club won the East of Scotland Qualifying Cup in 1963.  In 1969 the club moved to the City Park ground in Edinburgh.

In 1972 the club became members of SFA which allowed them to enter the Scottish Qualifying Cup which they won in 1973 which previously had not been open to them. The club's first match in the Scottish Cup was on 16 December 1972 against Duns.

In 1974, as a result of the demise of Third Lanark seven years earlier, and the new three-tier format of the Scottish Football League, a place opened up in the second division of the competition. After beating off competition from four Highland League sides, Hawick Royal Albert and Gateshead United, Ferranti Thistle were accepted into the league by a vote of 21–16 over Inverness Thistle. The club faced a number of obstacles before they could join the Division as their name did not meet stringent SFL rules on overt sponsorship of teams at the time and the City Ground was not up to standard. The local council offered use of Meadowbank Stadium, a modern stadium built in 1970. After an Edinburgh Evening News campaign to find a name for the club, the name Meadowbank Thistle was chosen. This was approved by the SFL in time for the new season.

Meadowbank Thistle (1974–1995)
 Having had little time to form a squad from the existing Ferranti squad, the first Meadowbank Thistle manager John Bain faced an uphill task to produce a competitive squad in time for the new season. Meadowbank played their first competitive match in the League Cup, eventually losing 1–0 to Albion Rovers. In 1983 the club achieved promotion to the First Division but ultimately were relegated back to the Second Division at the end of the 1984–85 season.

In the 1986–87 season, Meadowbank won the Second Division championship and won promotion to the First Division. They finished runners-up in the First Division in the following season, but were denied promotion to the Premier Division due to league reconstruction.

The part-time club began to struggle, and it became a limited company in 1993 but was relegated a short time after at the end of the 1992–93 season to the Second Division. Meadowbank suffered a second relegation in 1994–95, finishing second from bottom in the Second Division and due to the creation of a Third Division were relegated. After this, Chairman Bill Hunter claimed Meadowbank had run into severe financial difficulties and were facing closure as a result. In the face of significant opposition from many Meadowbank fans who objected to the dropping of the club name and the team moving from Edinburgh, in 1995 Meadowbank Thistle relocated to a new stadium in the new town of Livingston and changed name again, to Livingston Football Club.

Livingston (1995–)

Rise to prominence
In their first season as Livingston they were crowned champions of the Third Division for the 1995–96 season. Three years later, in 1998–99, they won promotion again as Second Division champions. Another promotion followed in 2000–01 when the club finished champions of First Division and gained promotion to the Scottish Premier League (SPL), just six seasons after the relocation to Livingston. Livingston's first SPL campaign, 2001–02, brought more success as they finished third in the league (behind the Old Firm) and qualified for the UEFA Cup for the first time. Jim Leishman's side gave a competent showing in the UEFA Cup. After disposing of FC Vaduz of Liechtenstein on the away goal rule after a 1–1 draw, they came up against SK Sturm Graz of Austria, and after a 14-goal, two-leg affair they missed out on the second round, going out on the wrong side of an 8–6 aggregate scoreline. The club avoided relegation the following season finishing 9th. After this season, manager Jim Leishman became the club's director of football and was replaced by Brazilian manager Márcio Máximo, who resigned only a few months into the following campaign and was in turn replaced by Leishman's former assistant, Davie Hay. Under Hay's management, Livingston won their first national trophy in 2004 by winning the 2003–04 League Cup after a 2–0 win over Hibernian at Hampden Park. The goals in the final were scored by Derek Lilley and Jamie McAllister.

Administration and SPL relegation
The club's rise was short-lived as they were plunged into administration on 3 February 2004. It was 13 May 2005 before Livingston emerged from administration, following a period of financial turmoil in which the previous boardroom occupants were ousted to make way for Pearse Flynn's Lionheart Consortium. Flynn's first decision was to sack Davie Hay, stating that he wanted a younger man in charge, and to that end appointed Allan Preston as the club's new manager. While Preston's term as Livingston manager started brightly with a 3–0 win over newly promoted Inverness Caledonian Thistle, the club failed to win another league game under his management, resulting in his dismissal in November with the club rooted to the bottom of the SPL. Richard Gough succeeded Preston and steered the club to survival on the last day of the season with a 1–1 draw with Dundee that relegated Dundee in their place, but Gough refused to stay as manager past the end of that season due to family problems and returned to the US, and former Celtic player Paul Lambert succeeded him. On 11 February 2006, Lambert resigned as Livingston manager after seven straight defeats leaving Livingston bottom of the Scottish Premier League. He was replaced by former player and coach John Robertson. Despite his best efforts, Livingston were relegated for the first time in May 2006 after only picking up 18 points that season. It was the worst record since the SPL began and was only beaten during the 2007–08 season by Gretna, after they were deducted 10 points for going into administration.

First Division and second administration 
A poor showing in the 2006–07 First Division saw John Robertson removed as Livingston manager on 15 April 2007. His successor was announced on 22 May 2007 as former Hibernian assistant coach Mark Proctor. Proctor appointed Curtis Fleming as his assistant on 26 June 2007, but both were sacked in June 2008 after a disappointing season in which they finished seventh. Livingston were taken over that summer by Italian majority shareholders Angelo Massone, Tommaso Bruno, Alessandro Di Mattia, and Tommaso Angelini after Pearse Flynn sold his shares in June 2008. The Italians were thought to be close to appointing fellow Italian Roberto Landi as head coach in June and he was made manager of the First Division side on 11 June 2008. He and assistant Valter Berlini were then fired on 1 December 2008 after just five months in charge. Paul Hegarty was linked with the job on 3 December 2008, and formally appointed two days later. Hegarty was subsequently suspended as manager on 26 April 2009 and his contract allowed to expire.

John Murphy was appointed head coach on 30 June 2009, the same day the club faced a deadline to pay debt to West Lothian Council who owned Almondvale Stadium. After that was not met, legal proceedings were carried out against the club to come to an arrangement over the debt within fourteen days or potentially face again going into administration. Livingston were placed into administration on 24 July 2009 by the Court of Session in Edinburgh, and faced relegation to the Third Division, a points deduction or being removed from the Scottish Football League entirely.
On 27 July 2009, it was revealed that the club were likely to go into liquidation after owner Angelo Massone said he would refuse a £25,000 offer for the club from their administrator. On 28 July 2009, Massone yet again refused the offer and the administrator subsequently started the liquidation process. While Livingston seemed doomed, a meeting with the Scottish Football League on 30 July 2009 secured their future, as they agreed to allow prospective new owners Gordon McDougall and Neil Rankine (part of the Livingston 5 Consortium) to run the club for the following season. The next day, Massone sold his shares to the new owners and left the club, and it was also announced that John Murphy had been appointed back to his previous role as goalkeeping coach, with ex-player Gary Bollan becoming the club's new manager. In the first game after the new owners took over, Livingston were on the wrong end of a cup shock in the Scottish League Cup first round, losing 3–0 to Albion Rovers, a team two divisions below them.

Demotion to the Third Division
Despite the prospective new owners ensuring that Livingston's future as a professional football club would be secure for the next year at least by paying a £720,000 bond to the SFL, on 5 August 2009 the Scottish Football League took the unprecedented move to demote Livingston to the Third Division. A breach of rules on insolvency was the main reason behind the decision. The administrator of the club, Donald McGruther, admitted his concern after the decision, saying that "In my view, this represents the death knell of Livingston Football Club". Gordon McDougall, a member of the Livingston 5 Consortium stated that "We've got to consider all the options that are open to us – it makes it very, very difficult". It was feared that the club could not survive in the Third Division due to a significant loss of revenue. However, despite the decision and the likely financial impacts, the consortium continued with their bid to take over the club. An appeal was lodged and as a result the club refused to play their opening Division Three fixture against East Stirlingshire on 8 August 2009. Because of this, the club were threatened with a points deduction, but in the event they were given a £3,000 fine for their actions. This was later overturned on appeal, meaning that the club ultimately escaped any punishment for their boycott of the match. On 7 September 2009 a further appeal to the SFA was dismissed, and the club finally accepted their Third Division fate.

Title wins and First Division return
On 15 August 2009, Livingston opened their Third Division campaign against Montrose at home and ran out comfortable 2–0 winners. On 17 April 2010, Livingston won the Scottish Third Division title after drawing 0–0 at home to Berwick Rangers. Goalkeeper Roddy McKenzie saved a last minute penalty to ensure the title was on its way to Almondvale. The Lions ended the season on 78 points, 15 points ahead of second placed Forfar Athletic. The following season on 9 April 2011, Livingston secured the Second Division title with a second consecutive title win to earn promotion back to the Scottish First Division with a 3–0 victory over Stenhousemuir at Ochilview Park. On 9 February 2012, Bollan was sacked as manager after two and a half years in charge. Nine days later on 14 February 2012, John Hughes and John Collins were appointed as manager and director of football respectively. However, on 13 November 2012, it was announced that Hughes had left the club to take charge of Hartlepool United. Gareth Evans became manager after being promoted from his position as assistant manager but he was sacked on 28 February 2013 due to ‘concerns over his stewardship’. Collins subsequently resigned from his position as director of football. On 25 March 2013, Richie Burke was appointed as manager along with Mark Burchill as assistant manager. Livingston ended season 2012–13 with a 4th-place finish in the First Division, their highest league finish since they were relegated from the SPL in 2006. On 12 September 2013, Burke resigned from his post as manager and was subsequently replaced by John McGlynn. When McGlynn took over Livingston were bottom of the Scottish Championship with only 1 point. Improved performances under his leadership took the club into contention for the promotion play-offs. As a result he was awarded an extended contract in January 2014. Livingston eventually finished in 6th place in 2013–14.

However Livingston struggled the following season and were in severe danger of relegation. McGlynn left Livingston by mutual consent in December 2014, following a 1–0 home defeat by Falkirk, which left the club bottom of the league, four points behind second bottom Cowdenbeath. Mark Burchill replaced McGlynn as the club's manager. Off the field problems also once again plagued the club during this season. The club were deducted 5 points by the SPFL for failing to pay tax on bonuses paid during the 2010–11 season. Former club director Ged Nixon tried to get the courts to freeze the clubs bank accounts as he claimed the club owed him £300,000. This sparked fears that the club would go into administration for a third time. Nixon lost his court case in April 2015, saving the club from this fate. Livingston won the 2014–15 Scottish Challenge Cup, defeating Alloa 4–0 in the final at McDiarmid Park. With two games of the season remaining Livingston were still adrift at the bottom of the league, three points behind relegation rivals Alloa and four behind Cowdenbeath. A 4–0 win away at Raith Rovers moved the club into 9th place on goal difference going into the final game of the season. Livingston won their final game of the season 1–0 at home to Queen of the South to pull off the great escape and finish in 8th place, avoiding both automatic relegation and the relegation play-off.

Livingston were struggling against relegation again in season 2015–16. Burchill was sacked in December 2015 following a 1–1 draw with Dumbarton as Livingston sat second bottom of the league. David Hopkin replaced him as manager. However there was to be no great escape this season. Livingston finished in 9th place in the Championship, which meant they had to contest the Championship Play-Off to avoid relegation to Scottish League One. They faced Stranraer in the play-off semi-final. Livingston lost the first leg 5–2 away at Stranraer, giving themselves a very difficult task for the second leg. In the second leg Livingston won 4–1 in 90 minutes to take the tie to extra time. However two extra time Stranraer goals took the score to 4–3 on the day and 6–8 on aggregate, confirming Livingston's relegation to League One, ending a five year stint in the second tier.

League One and consecutive promotions

Despite relegation, Livingston decided to stay as a full-time football club, and David Hopkin was retained as manager for the 2016–17 season, as Livingston aimed to bounce back to the Championship. Livingston went on to win the league comfortably and secured the title in April 2017 following a 2–1 win at home to Alloa Athletic. Livingston finished 19 points clear at the top of the league.

Livingston continued this impressive form into the Championship in 2017–18 and sat in the play-off places in joint 3rd in the league after 20 games. The club also reached the quarter-finals of the Scottish League Cup, where they were unlucky to go down 3–2 at Hibernian. It was the first time they reached this stage of the league cup since 2005–06.

On 21 April 2018 Livingston secured second place in the Championship after a 3–0 win over already relegated Brechin City.

Qualifying for the Premiership play-off final, they faced Partick Thistle, who escaped automatic relegation in their final game. Despite this, Livingston won 3–1 on aggregate, 2–1 at home and 1–0 away, earning the final place in the Scottish Premiership and their first season of top-flight football since 2006, relegating Partick Thistle to the Championship in the process, ending Thistle's five-year stint in the Premiership.

Scottish Premiership

Livingston retained their status as a top flight club in season 2018–19 with a 9th place finish. This was bettered the following season with the club sitting in 5th before the season was curtailed as a result of COVID-19. The points per game ruling confirmed this placing as Livi's first top 6 finish since 2001–02. In 2020–21, the feat was repeated with a sixth place finish. The season was also notable for the club reaching the Scottish League Cup final for the first time since 2004.

Colours and badge
The predominant club colours are amber and black, which have been used since the formation of the club in 1943. The strip typically has an amber top, with the shorts normally black and the socks amber, usually with some black detail. The original strip for the club during the first couple of season in the Ferranti Thistle era was amber and black hoops. After this, solid amber shirts, black shorts and amber socks (occasionally black) became established as the club's home kit. During the recent Livingston era the club have also used all black home strips, and a white and orange kit was used during 2002–03 season. The colours of white, black, purple, blue and red have been mainly used in the away strips.

The badge used to identify the club has changed four times in the club's history. The Ferranti Thistle badge featured a black circular base. Three symbols were incorporated into the badge; a football, a thistle and a lion rampant in the centre holding aloft a Scottish flag. A new badge was then formed as the club changed their name to Meadowbank Thistle. The badge was based on a traditional shield shape with a black being the predominant colour and amber on the outer-trim. The badge features a thistle as the centre piece, with the flower part of the plant being replaced with a football. As the club moved to Livingston, the badge was changed again. The design of the thistle and the football is altered slightly; with the one major change being the addition of a Latin club motto "Fortitier omnia vincit" with the English translation meaning "Bravely conquers all". The current badge is modernised from the original Livingston badge but most of the features remain. The present badge also reintroduced the lion rampant in the centre of the laurel.

Sponsorship

In the Meadowbank Thistle era between 1973 and 1995, the club sourced various shirt sponsorship deals largely from small business such as Ferranti, Sports Conscious, Park & Milton, Raj Restaurant, ACA and PAR Scaffolding. Mitsubishi became the first major shirt sponsor of the club for the first three seasons of the Livingston era. Motorola then sponsored the club for the next four years. However, Motorola withdrew their shirt sponsorship at the end of the 2001–02 season, after the company’s decline in the area. In 2002, Intelligent Finance, one of the largest employers in the West Lothian area, agreed an initial two-year sponsorship deal with the club worth an undisclosed six-figure sum. The company extended their shirt sponsorship for three more years, making their total sponsorship span over a five-year period.

Smarter Loans became the club's main sponsor during the 2007–08 season, before the IT company, RDF, signed a two-year deal to become main sponsors for seasons 2008–09 and 2009–10. However they withdrew their sponsorship after only one year, as a result of the ongoing financial crisis at the club that summer. Local company Fasteq became the new main sponsor for season 2009–10 after the arrival of the new club owners. After four successful years as sponsors, Fasteq withdrew their sponsorship and Livingston announced that they were looking for new shirt sponsors for season 2013–14. Local business  Energy Assets were confirmed as new main sponsors on a three-year deal in June 2013.

Stadiums

The club have had three main grounds in their history; as Ferranti Thistle, the club initially played in local parks before finding a home at City Park in Edinburgh in 1969, then moving to Meadowbank Stadium in 1974 which was built for the 1970 Commonwealth Games.

Livingston currently play their home games at the Almondvale Stadium in Livingston. It is currently known as the Tony Macaroni Arena due to a sponsorship deal. The 9,512 capacity stadium was constructed in 1995 as a joint venture between Meadowbank Thistle and the Livingston Development Corporation (LDC). Part of the deal involved the relocation of Meadowbank Thistle to the town and a name change to Livingston. When the LDC was wound up, ownership of the Stadium was transferred to West Lothian Council and the council have since rented the stadium to the club. The ground has hosted Scotland under-21, under-19, under-17s and Ladies matches, as well as one home game for Gretna due to problems with their ground share at Fir Park. In April 2011 it was revealed that it was possible Livingston would relocate to a new stadium around one mile from the current site due to West Lothian Council looking to sell the current site to a supermarket chain.

Players

First-team squad

On loan

Notable players
For a complete list of former and current Livingston F.C. players with a Wikipedia article, see here.

Players who reached full international status:

   Neil Alexander
   Efe Ambrose
   Guillermo Amor
   Marvin Andrews
   Dylan Bahamboula
   Scott Bitsindou
   Ciaron Brown
   Mark Burchill
   Eugène Dadi
   Murray Davidson
   Graham Dorrans
   Rab Douglas
   Lyndon Dykes
   Declan Gallagher
   Esmaël Gonçalves
   Danny Griffin
   Leigh Griffiths
   Kurtis Guthrie¹
   Wes Hoolahan
   Darren Jackson
   Hassan Kachloul
   Brian Kerr
   Paul Lambert
   Steve Lawson
   Mariusz Liberda
   Stuart Lovell
   Chérif Touré Mamam
   Jamie McAllister
   Grant McCann
   David McNamee
   Marc McNulty
   James McPake
   Dolly Menga
   Kenny Miller
   Lee Miller
   Joel Nouble¹
   Harry Panayiotou
   Marko Rajamäki
   John Robertson
   Maurice Ross
   Matija Sarkic
   Steven Saunders
   Robert Snodgrass
   Goran Stanić
   Anthony Stokes
   Gábor Vincze
   Theodore Whitmore
   Robbie Winters
   Davide Xausa

¹Non-FIFA recognised country

Club staff

Coaching staff

Source

Former non-playing staff
For a complete list of former and current Livingston F.C. non-playing staff with a Wikipedia article, see here.

Executive

Managerial history

¹ Managers between 1974 and 1995, when the club were known as Meadowbank Thistle.

c Caretaker managers.

p Player managers.

Honours

From major national honours to reserve league wins, Livingston have been successful in recent history, and were the first club in Scotland to win all three divisions (Third Division 1995–96, Second Division 1998–99 and First Division 2000–01) in their rise to the Scottish Premier League in 2001. Their most notable trophy win being the Scottish League Cup in 2004, where they triumphed in a 2–0 victory over Hibernian at Hampden Park. Their most recent honour was the Scottish League One title in season 2016–17.

In 2015 Livingston lifted the Scottish Challenge Cup recording a 4–0 victory over Alloa Athletic at McDiarmid Park.

Senior
Scottish League Cup: 2003–04Runners-up: 2020–21
Scottish First Division (2nd tier): 2000–01
Scottish Second Division/League One (3rd tier): 1986–87¹, 1998–99, 2010–11, 2016–17 
Scottish Third Division (4th tier): 1995–96, 2009–10
Scottish Challenge Cup: 2014–15Runners-up'': 2000–01
Scottish Qualifying Cup (South): 1973–74²

Reserve
Reserve League Cup: 1998–99, 2000–01
Reserve League West: 2000–01
SPFL Reserve League 2: 2018–19, 2019–20

Youth
SFL Under 19 Youth Division: 2007–08, 2008–09, 2009–10, 2010–11
SFL Under 19 Youth League Cup: 2008–09
SFL Under 17 Division: 2011–12
SFL Under 17 Youth League Cup: 2010–11

¹ This includes honours won between 1974 and 1995, when the club were known as Meadowbank Thistle.

² This includes honours won between 1943 and 1974, when the club were known as Ferranti Thistle.

Club records
Record Victory: 8–0 v Stranraer, Scottish League Cup First round, 4 August 2012
Record Home Victory: 7–1 v Clyde, 14 December 2009
Record Defeat: 0–8 v Hamilton Academical, 14 December 1974
Record Defeat as Livingston: 0–7 v Hibernian, 8 February 2006
Most Consecutive Wins (Livingston era): 9 – 2016–17
Most Appearances (Meadowbank era): Walter Boyd, 450
Most Appearances (Livingston era): Scott Pittman (310)
Most Goals in a Season (Player): 27 – Liam Buchanan (2016–17)
Most Goals in a Season (Team): 80 – (2016–17)
Most Points in a Season: 82 – (2010–11)
Record Home Attendance: 10,112 v Rangers, 27 October 2001
Record Transfer Fee Paid: £200,000 for Lyndon Dykes (Queen of the South, 2019)
Record Transfer Fee Received: £2,000,000 for Lyndon Dykes (Queens Park Rangers, 2020)

European record

Livingston are undefeated at home in European competitions. They have qualified for a UEFA club competition on one occasion. The club finished third in the Scottish Premier League (behind Celtic and Rangers) in season 2001–02 and hence qualified for a place in the UEFA Cup for the following season. They entered at the qualifying round stage and were drawn against FC Vaduz of Liechtenstein. Livingston narrowly overcame their opponents after drawing 1–1 on aggregate, going through to the next round on the away goals rule. After drawing the home leg 0–0 Óscar Rubio scored the decisive away goal. In the following round they were drawn against Austrian side SK Sturm Graz. They were defeated 8–6 on aggregate, losing the first leg 5–2 in Austria at the Arnold Schwarzenegger Stadium before winning the return leg 4–3 at Almondvale. Barry Wilson scored two goals against Sturm Graz, making him Livingston’s highest goalscorer in European competitions to date.

See also
 Relocation of professional sports teams
 Works team

References

External links

Livi for Life Supporters Trust

 
Association football clubs established in 1943
Football clubs in Scotland
Football in West Lothian
Scottish Premier League teams
Scottish Football League teams
1943 establishments in Scotland
Scottish Professional Football League teams
Scottish League Cup winners
Scottish Challenge Cup winners
Companies that have entered administration in the United Kingdom
Sports team relocations
Livingston, West Lothian